The Tuy River is a river of northern Venezuela, in the Valles del Tuy (Tuy Valleys) of Miranda State. The principal river of Miranda, it flows north from Aragua State through Miranda into the Caribbean Sea. Tributaries include the Guaire River, the principal river of Caracas, and the Caucagua River.

Towns on the Tuy River include Cúa and Ocumare del Tuy.

See also
List of rivers of Venezuela
http://mounier.univ-tln.fr/rcmo/php_biblio/PDF/5393.pdf

References
Rand McNally, The New International Atlas, 1993.

Rivers of Miranda (state)
Rivers of Venezuela